Senator Plummer may refer to:

Gary Plummer (politician) (fl. 1970s–2010s), Maine State Senate
George Plummer (1785–1872), Connecticut State Senate
Jason Plummer (politician) (born 1982), Illinois State Senate
Kemp Plummer (1769–1826), North Carolina State Senate
W. H. Plummer (1860–1926), Washington State Senate

See also
William Plumer (1759–1850), U.S. Senator from New Hampshire
William Plumer Jr. (1789–1854), New Hampshire State Senate